James Shields is an 1893 bronze sculpture of James Shields by Leonard Volk, installed in the United States Capitol, in Washington, D.C., as part of the National Statuary Hall Collection. It is one of two statues donated by the state of Illinois. The sculpture was unveiled by Senator Shelby Moore Cullom of Illinois on December 6, 1893.

See also
 1893 in art

References

External links
 

1893 establishments in Washington, D.C.
1893 sculptures
Marble sculptures in Washington, D.C.
Monuments and memorials in Washington, D.C.
Shields, James
Sculptures of men in Washington, D.C.